Amarachi is an Igbo unisex given name which translates to "God's grace" in English. Notable people who bear the name include:
 Amarachi (born July 17, 2004) – Nigerian singer
 Bede Amarachi Osuji (born January 21, 1996) – Nigerian footballer
 Amarachi Obiajunwa (born October 10, 1989) – Nigerian wrestler

Igbo given names